Ernest Louis "Iron Mike" Massad (December 25, 1908 — February 20, 1993) was a college football star, major general of the U.S. Army, and successful oilman.

Biography
Massad was born in 1908 in Brinkman, Oklahoma to a Lebanese family, Namey and Shafiga Kouri Massad. After graduation from Ardmore High School, he enrolled in the University of Oklahoma in 1928. He starred in football, playing fullback, linebacker and kicker, and earned the nickname "Iron Mike" for his athletic ability. In 1956, he was chosen by Sports Illustrated magazine for inclusion in a set of "Men of Achievement" who had excelled at football in 1931, and in 1956 were "furnishing U.S. leadership in business, medicine, law, theology, diplomacy, teaching, coaching and the military."

Massad was a member of Reserve Officers' Training Corps from 1928 to 1932 and was commissioned as a Second Lieutenant in 1933. He married Mozelle Sockwell on January 30, 1939 in Shreveport, Louisiana, and had a son, Michael Louis, and a daughter, Elaine.

He was a member of the First Cavalry Division from 1940 to 1943. During World War II, he served in the 82nd Airborne Division and was promoted to battalion commander in the Eleventh Airborne Division, which fought in the Pacific Theater of Operations. He served as Commander of the 675th Para-Glider Field Artillery Battalion and fought in the New Guinea campaign and the battles of Leyte and Luzon. He was promoted to colonel in 1945 and left active duty in 1946.

Massad moved to Ardmore, Oklahoma, where he re-joined the US Army Reserve. In January 1958 he was named Assistant Division Commander of the 95th Infantry Division in January 1958 and was promoted to Brigadier General in May 1959. He was promoted to Major General on December 11, 1962, and left the Reserve in 1968.

He served as Deputy Assistant Secretary of Defense receiving his 3rd Star for reserve affairs in Washington D.C., appointed by President Lyndon B. Johnson. He served as Chairman of the State of Oklahoma Fair Board and was inducted into the Oklahoma Hall of Fame. He was elected Vice President of the Oklahoma Heritage Association on January 27, 1984.

In 1963 the Western Federation of American Syrian and Lebanese Clubs named Massad American Lebanese Man of the Year.

After military life, he was an independent operator of the E.L. "Mike" Massad Oil Company and a successful businessman in housing and real estate. He died on February 20, 1993, in an Oklahoma City hospital.

Awards and decorations
Among Massad's service awards and decorations were the Army Distinguished Service Medal, Silver Star, Legion of Merit, Bronze Star with Oak Leaf Cluster, Purple Heart, Silver Arrowhead, and Presidential Unit Citation.

  Army Distinguished Service Medal
  Silver Star
  Legion of Merit
  Bronze Star with one Oak Leaf Cluster
  Purple Heart
  Army Presidential Unit Citation

References

 Caldwell, Tom (1986), From the Hills of Lebanon: The Syrian-Lebanese in Oklahoma, The Chronicles of Oklahoma
 Milligan, James C. (1992),  Iron Mike: The Life of General Ernest L. Massad, Western Heritage Books
 Dozier, Ray (2006), The Oklahoma Football Encyclopedia, Sports Publishing LLC
 Southwell, Kristina L. (2002), Guide to Manuscripts in the Western History Collections of the University of Oklahoma, University of Oklahoma Press
 Daily Oklahoman (Oklahoma City), February 22, 1993
 Encyclopedia of Oklahoma History and Culture
 OU Army History

United States Army generals
Recipients of the Distinguished Service Medal (US Army)
Recipients of the Silver Star
Recipients of the Legion of Merit
American people of Lebanese descent
People from Greer County, Oklahoma
Military personnel from Oklahoma
Businesspeople from Oklahoma
1908 births
1993 deaths
United States Department of Defense officials
20th-century American businesspeople
Sportspeople of Lebanese descent